Ellerhoop is a municipality in the district of Pinneberg in Schleswig Holstein, Germany. It is twinned with the village of Hurst Green, East Sussex, UK.

Geography
Ellerhoop is situated to the north of Hamburg, close to the A23 Autobahn.

Points of interest
 Arboretum Ellerhoop-Thiensen

References

Pinneberg (district)